Houghton Green Cliff is a  geological Site of Special Scientific Interest north of Rye in East Sussex, United Kingdom. It is a Geological Conservation Review site.

This site exposes the Cliff End Sandstone Member of the Wadhurst Clay Formation, part of the Wealden Group, which dates to the Lower Cretaceous between 140 and 100 million years ago. It is a key site for studies of sandstone bodies in the clay formation.

Ths site is at the side of a public road.

References

Sites of Special Scientific Interest in East Sussex
Geological Conservation Review sites